The bugle is a brass musical instrument.

Bugle may also refer to:

Places
 Bugle, Cornwall, a village near St Austell in the United Kingdom
Bugle railway station
 Bugle Field, a Baltimore, Maryland, stadium used by two primary Negro league baseball teams from 1916 to 1950
 Bugle Rock, South Bangalore, Karnataka, India

Arts, entertainment, and media

Periodicals
 Bugle (newspaper) or Bugle-American, a former underground newspaper in Milwaukee and Madison, Wisconsin
 Black Country Bugle, an English weekly newspaper
 The Anti-Slavery Bugle, an abolitionist newspaper published from 1845 to 1861 in Ohio, United States
 The Baum Bugle, the official journal of The International Wizard of Oz Club 
 The Bugle, a newspaper which was merged into the Bugle-Observer, based in Woodstock, New Brunswick, Canada

Other arts, entertainment, and media
 Daily Bugle, a fictitious newspaper in the Marvel Comics universe
 The Bugle, satirical podcast created by John Oliver and Andy Zaltzman

Other uses
 Bugle, a common name of the flowering plant genus Ajuga
 Boulton & Paul Bugle, a British biplane bomber first flown in 1923
 Bugles (snack), corn chip snack
 The Bugle, Wikipedia's military history newsletter

See also
 Bugler (disambiguation)
 Bugel, surname
 Bugling, a sound made by a bull elk
 Ngöbe Buglé people, an indigenous people of Panama